Daybreaker is the fourth studio album by American rock group Moon Taxi. It was released on 2 October 2015.

Track listing

References

External links

2015 albums